Dessie Dolan (born 11 July 1979) is an Irish Gaelic football manager who has been manager of the senior Westmeath county team since 2022.

He played for the Garrycastle club and for the Westmeath county team, as well as international rules football for Ireland. He won a Leinster Senior Football Championship medal with Westmeath in 2004 and was given an All Star at the end of the year. He was his county's highest championship scorer until John Heslin overtook him in the 2022 Tailteann Cup Final (for which Dolan was a selector).

Playing career

University
Dolan played football for NUI Galway while studying at the team's parent university. He was unable to play during the 2003 Sigerson Cup winning game as a result of a torn hamstring sustained during the quarter-final.

Inter-county
Dolan has been widely regarded as Westmeath's leading talisman throughout their ascension from GAA minnows to quality opposition. Despite the growth and promise demonstrated in their 1999 U21 All Ireland victory, Westmeath experienced their most successful GAA period of their history between 2001–2008.

Largely due to virtually unmatchable talent in attack, Westmeath forced their way into GAA pundits' heads as upsetters and sometimes favourites. Two Division 2 league titles spearheaded by Dolan's attacking prowess and eventually, in 2004, Championship success in winning a Leinster Senior Football Championship title finally showed the squad's promise.

Westmeath reached three All-Ireland Senior Football Championship quarter-finals since the revamped championship system of 2001, with Dolan starring each season (2001, 2004, 2006).

In 2013, Dolan expressed concern about the gulf in class that had opened up between the Dublins and Westmeaths.

In summer of 2014, Dolan announced his retirement from inter-county football following the subsequent exit to Cavan.

Club
At club level Dolan won numerous underage titles and back-to-back senior titles in 2005 and 2006 with club, Garrycastle.

His last competitive game was a Leinster Senior Club Football Championship semi-final defeat to Ballyboden St Enda's in November 2019.

International rules
Dolan was regularly selected for the Ireland international rules football team until the series was suspended in 2006.

Managerial career
Dolan was appointed manager of the Westmeath senior football team on 21 September 2022.

Other interests

In 2017 Dolan and his wife Kelly participated in an episode of Room to Improve, series 10, episode 3, 'Moate'.

Dolan participated in a marketing campaign for Ireland West Airport Knock. 

He currently works as a pundit on The Sunday Game.

Honours
Garrycastle
Leinster Senior Club Football Championship (1): 2011
Westmeath Senior Football Championship (8): 2001, 2002, 2004, 2009, 2010, 2011, 2014, 2019
Westmeath Division 1 Leagues (8): 2001, 2002, 2003, 2008, 2009, 2012, 2018, 2019

Westmeath
Leinster Senior Football Championship (1): 2004
National Football League, Division 2 (3): 2001, 2003, 2008
All-Ireland Under-21 Football Championship (1): 1999
Leinster Under-21 Football Championship (2): 1999, 2000

Individual
All Star (1): 2004

References

External links
 https://web.archive.org/web/20120213141318/http://www.garrycastlegaa.com/clubhistory.html

1979 births
Living people
Alumni of the University of Galway
Donegal Boston Gaelic footballers
Gaelic football forwards
Gaelic games commentators
Garrycastle Gaelic footballers
Irish international rules football players
Irish schoolteachers
University of Galway Gaelic footballers
Westmeath inter-county Gaelic footballers